Seung-hoon, also spelled Seung-hun, is a Korean masculine given name. Its meaning differs based on the hanja with which it is written. There are 15 hanja with the reading "seung" and 12 hanja with the reading "hoon" on the South Korean government's official list of hanja which may be used in given names.

People with this name include:
Yi Seung-hun (1756–1801), Korean Roman Catholic martyr
Lee Seung-hoon (boxer) (born 1960), South Korean boxer
Oh Seung-hoon (born 1988), South Korean football player
Lee Seung-hoon (born 1988), South Korean speed skater
Shin Seung-hun (born 1966), South Korean ballad singer
Oh Seung-hoon (actor) (born 1991), South Korean actor and model
Lee Seung-hoon (musician) (born 1992), South Korean singer, member of boy band Winner
Huni (video gamer) (born Heo Seung-hoon, 1997), South Korean League of Legends player

Fictional characters with this name include:
Yoo Seung-hoon, in 2012 South Korean television series Shut Up Flower Boy Band

See also
List of Korean given names
You Seung-hun (born 1983), South Korean swimmer, whose given name is spelled Seung-hyeon (승현) in Revised Romanisation

References

Korean masculine given names